Norm Houghton may refer to:

Norm Houghton (magician) (1909–1998)
Norm Houghton (historian) (born 1948), historian and archivist
Norm Houghton (pioneer irrigator) (died 2014), rice farmer in Australia